"Azzurro"  is an Italian pop song composed by Paolo Conte and Vito Pallavicini. Its most famous version was recorded by Adriano Celentano in 1968.

Background
Conte and Pallavicini wrote "Azzurro" especially for Celentano. The song describes a lonely summer in the city. Structurally it typically reflects Conte's writing style, combining simple and catchy melodies with unusual elements, like the military march music bit in the middle. Conte would record the song himself in 1985, ten years into his own solo career as a performer. Together with "Via con me" and "Sotto le stelle del Jazz", it is now one of his most popular songs.

Lyrics
The first line of the chorus goes: "Azzurro, il pomeriggio è troppo azzurro e lungo per me . . ." (Blue, the afternoon is too long and blue for me...)

Charts

Certifications

Cover versions
The song was covered by numerous Italian singers, like Mina, Gianni Morandi and Fiorello. Even the Italian football national team has sung the song on one occasion. German covers were done by Peter Rubin, Die Toten Hosen, Peter Alexander and Rummelsnuff. French cover by Régine. Spanish cover by Gabinete Caligari. Czech cover by Waldemar Matuška, (lyrics by Zdeněk Borovec). Hungarian cover by László Aradszky (lyrics by Kálmán Vándor). In the 2020 Abu Dhabi Grand Prix, German F1 driver Sebastian Vettel sang a farewell song to his Ferrari team after the final race for them, which was based on the song.

Arik Einstein cover
In Israel, it is a famous song known for its Hebrew version by Arik Einstein "Amru Lo" (Hebrew: "They told him..."). The lyrics, by prominent Israeli songwriter Eli Mohar, do not feature a translation of the original lyrics; Instead, the Hebrew version humorously tells the life story of a youngster who chooses a precarious career as an artist and becomes a fan of an underdog sports team, despite having always been told to "choose the correct path in life" - a reference to Arik Einstein's own life story.

Die Toten Hosen cover

"Azzurro" (on many releases mistitled "Azzuro") was covered by Die Toten Hosen for the album Auf dem Kreuzzug ins Glück as a tribute to 1990 FIFA World Cup.

The single was released with differently coloured covers: green, orange, pink and yellow.

Music video
The video was directed by Hanns Christian Müller.

The band drives around Italy in an Opel, having to push-start it every time. In the end it gets stolen right before them.

Track listing
 "Azzurro" (Conte, Virano/Conte, Pallavicini) − 2:32
 "Herzlichen Glückwunsch" (Sincere congratulation) (v. Holst/Frege) – 2:03
 "Dr. Sommer" (Dr. Summer) (Breitkopf/Frege) – 1:57
 "Feinde" (Enemies) (Frege/Frege) – 2:20

Charts

References

1990 singles
Italian songs
Die Toten Hosen songs
Adriano Celentano songs
Songs with lyrics by Vito Pallavicini
1968 songs
Virgin Records singles
Number-one singles in Italy
Songs with music by Paolo Conte